Albrecht Wellmer (9 July 1933 – 13 September 2018) was a German philosopher at the Freie Universität Berlin.

Biography

He studied mathematics and physics at Berlin and Kiel, then philosophy and sociology at Heidelberg and Frankfurt. He was an assistant to Jürgen Habermas at the University of Frankfurt from 1966 to 1970. He has held Professorships at the Universität Konstanz (1974–1990), the New School for Social Research and at the Freie Universität Berlin (1990 until his retirement in 2001). He has held guest Professorships at Haverford, Stony Brook, Collège International de Philosophie, the New School of Social Research and the University of Amsterdam.

Awards
In 2006 he received the Theodor W. Adorno Award, a prestigious award for achievement in philosophy, theatre, music, and film.
In 2011 he received the Anna-Krüger-Preis of the Berlin Institute for Advanced Study.

Works

His works include books and articles about Aesthetics, Music, Critical Theory, Ethics, Modernity, and Postmodernity as well as thinkers such as Adorno, Habermas, Rorty, and Wittgenstein.

Personal life 
From 1965 to 1981 Albrecht Wellmer was married to Ilse von Neander. He is the father of composer and artist Anne Wellmer. Albrecht Wellmer's grave is at Alter St. Matthäus Kirchhof in Berlin.

References

External links
 List of works by Albrecht Wellmer at the Open Library
 Albrecht Wellmer's Homepage
 List of articles by Albrecht Wellmer at PhilPapers
 Article by Albrecht Wellmer on Richard Rorty: 'Rereading Rorty', Krisis, 2008, 2
 Albrecht Wellmer – Adorno and the Difficulties of a Critical Reconstruction of the Historical Present - free MP3 audio recording of Wellmer from November 2009
 Frankfurter Allgemeine Zeitung, 03.07.2006
 Anna-Krueger-Preis des Wissenschaftskolleg in Berlin, 04.05.2011
 Tagesspiegel, 18.9.2018
 Frankfurter Allgemeine Zeitung, 18.9.2018

1933 births
2018 deaths
Academic staff of the Free University of Berlin
German political philosophers
German political scientists
German sociologists
20th-century German philosophers
Continental philosophers
Philosophers of music
Philosophers of language
Social philosophers
Frankfurt School
German male writers
People from Dachau (district)